Bicuspidon is an extinct genus of Polyglyphanodontid lizard known from the Late Cretaceous of North America, Europe and Africa, two species, B. numerosus and B. smikros are known from the Cenomanian of Utah in  the Mussentuchit Member of the Cedar Mountain Formation and the Naturita Formation respectively. While B. hatzegiensis is known from the Maastrichtian Sânpetru Formation of Romania and B. hogreli is known from the Cenomanian Kem Kem Beds of Morocco. An indeterminate taxon closely related to B. hatzegiensis referred to as B. aff. hatzegiensis  is known from the Santonian Csehbánya Formation of Hungary. The dentition is heterodont, with conical anterior teeth and transversely orientated biscuspid posterior teeth.

References 

Late Cretaceous reptiles of North America
Late Cretaceous reptiles of Africa
Extinct reptiles
Late Cretaceous lepidosaurs of Europe